Jan Groenendijk (6 July 19469 February 2014) was a Dutch football player.

Club career
Born in Vreeswijk, Groenendijk came through the youth ranks at hometown club Geinoord and made his professional debut in the Eerste Divisie for Elinkwijk and joined new club FC Utrecht who were formed by a merger of DOS, Elinkwijk and Velox in 1970. On Wednesday 19 August 1970 he became the first ever goalscorer of the new club after scoring in 1-4 defeat by Feyenoord. He would become the club's first top goalscorer that season with 18.

He later played for Go Ahead Eagles and Wageningen.

Death
Groenendijk died of esophageal cancer on 9 February 2014.

References

External links
 Bio - Bunnikside 

1946 births
2014 deaths
People from Nieuwegein
Association football forwards
Dutch footballers
FC Utrecht players
Go Ahead Eagles players
FC Wageningen players
Eredivisie players
Deaths from esophageal cancer
Deaths from cancer in the Netherlands
USV Elinkwijk players
Footballers from Utrecht (province)